The list of ship commissionings in 1970 includes a chronological list of all ships commissioned in 1970.


See also 

1970
 Ship commissionings